Perks Matriculation Higher Secondary School, India, is a part of Perks Institutions that is run by the Ramaswami Naidu and Ramaranganathan charities, Coimbatore. The school was founded by Mr. R. Rama Ranganathan in the year 1971. The school is situated in the heart of the Coimbatore City.  The school is recognised by the Government of Tamil Nadu and follows the State approved Syllabus (Samacheer). The school has classes from Nursery up to STD 12.

Founder
Rama Ranganathan, the founder of Perks Institutions, a Lok Shree awardee, is credited with having brought  the Davis Cup tournament to Coimbatore in 1975. He died on 10 November 2009 at the age of 83.

Facilities
Physics lab
Chemistry lab
Biology lab
Computer lab
Library
Basket ball courts
Volley ball courts 
Mini Theatre

Pyramid
The Perks campus is known for the pyramid that was constructed in 1992 by the founder and correspondent Lokshree. Sri Rama Ranganathan has published books on Pyramid.

Sports
Perks students are offered the following sports:
Basketball
 Volleyball
Chess
Karathe
Boxing
Shuttle
 Silambam

Notable alumni
 Sriram Balaji, ranked No.1 in India and now ranking No.14 in the U18 age group for tennis.

References

Private schools in Tamil Nadu
High schools and secondary schools in Tamil Nadu
Schools in Coimbatore